Preceded by more than a week of heavy rain, a slow-moving storm system dropped tremendous precipitation across much of Texas and Oklahoma during the nights of May 24–26, 2015, triggering record-breaking floods. Additionally, many areas reported tornado activity and lightning. Particularly hard hit were areas along the Blanco River in Hays County, Texas, where entire blocks of homes were leveled. On the morning of May 26, the National Weather Service issued a flash flood emergency for southwest Harris County (which includes the city of Houston) and northeast Fort Bend County. The system also produced deadly tornadoes in parts of Mexico, Texas, and Oklahoma. This flood significantly contributed to the wettest month ever for Texas and Oklahoma.

Meteorological synopsis

According to Bob Henson from Wunderground, inflow of low-level moisture from the Gulf of Mexico and the combination of very slow moving large-scale storm systems set the stage for the floods. He added,"Upper-level winds were largely aligned with the low-level frontal zone, an ideal setup for “thunderstorm training” (successive downpours over the same area). In addition, rains were concentrated by several mesoscale convective vortices, small-scale centers of low-pressure that developed along the frontal bands, in some cases resembling mini-tropical cyclones." The stationary trough during May is linked to both the El Niño and amplified midlatitude short-wave train.

Flooding
On May 14, 2015, prior to extensive flooding beginning around May 24, flash flood warnings were issued for counties in South East Texas. At least 14 people were killed, including 10 in Texas and 4 in Oklahoma, and another 11 remain missing.

Texas

Flooding along the Wichita River prompted evacuations of 390 homes in Wichita Falls. Up to 100,000 customers were without power.

Wichita Falls and Corpus Christi broke their previous records for all-time wettest month.

A 25-foot-by-25-foot sinkhole near a runway at the Dallas/Fort Worth International Airport caused the closure of the runway for a few hours.

Also on May 25, historic flooding along Shoal Creek inundated House Park in Austin, Texas damaging the turf among other things and forcing the Austin Aztex to search for a temporary home.

Houston
More than 500 water rescues were carried out by firefighters, which involved for the most part stranded motorists. At least 2,500 vehicles were abandoned, when drivers had to seek higher grounds.

Two people drowned after being trapped in their cars while a third was later found in bayou. A fourth person lost their life when an evacuation boat capsized during the morning of May 26. On May 26, Houston Mayor Annise Parker, estimated up to 4,000 properties with significant damage.

Blanco River
During the overnight of May 24–25, more than  fell along the watershed of the Blanco River. This broke the river's all-time peak of  set in 1929. Tremendous flash flooding ensued as a result, with areas of Hays County being particularly hard hit.

Entire blocks of homes in Wimberley were swept away by a "tidal wave of water" with officials reporting 350–400 residences destroyed in the town alone. For the first time, the river covered portions of Interstate 35, shutting down traffic for hours. Large trees and debris were deposited across the roadway.

One person in San Marcos, Texas was confirmed dead. Thirteen people were carried away when the home they were in was swept downstream. Residents reported seeing it being destroyed after striking a bridge. One occupant was recovered with significant injuries while the other twelve remain missing. At least 1,200 people have been left homeless along the river.

Oklahoma
On May 23, flash flooding along Highway 20 near Claremore claimed the life of a firefighter attempting to rescue people in an apartment complex. He was pulled into a storm drain obscured by the rising waters and carried hundreds of yards away. A fellow firefighter attempting to save him was pulled in as well but managed to escape.

A station Oklahoma City recorded  of rainfall in May 2015, which made it the all-time wettest month on record. Records date back to 1890.

From May 1 to May 25, 122 tornado warnings were reported by the National Weather Service in Oklahoma, more than in the same period

The Oklahoma Department of Transportation reported on May 26 that a number of highways were closed because of high water or damage from previous flooding.

Louisiana
Flooding in Ruston, Louisiana on 18 May caused an eleven-year-old boy to drown in a submerged car along Colvin Creek.

Response

On May 24, voluntary evacuations were extended to include 2,177 homes near the Wichita River. On May 25, near Houston, about 400 homes were placed under mandatory evacuation orders downstream from the Louis Creek Dam.

On May 25, Texas Governor Greg Abbott declared a state of emergency for 24 counties as a result of the ongoing disaster, and called the floods the biggest in Texas history. On May 26, President Barack Obama announced federal resources to help affected areas in Texas, and signed a disaster declaration for Oklahoma. Houston Mayor Annise Parker declared a local state of disaster for the city of Houston on May 26.

On May 26, Governor Mary Fallin declared a state of emergency for all 77 counties in Oklahoma.

Climate change
A study by Utah State University  analyzed the pathway in which anthropogenic global warming contributed to the persistent precipitation in May 2015: Warming in the tropical Pacific acted to strengthen the teleconnection toward North America, modification of zonal wave-5 circulation that deepened the stationary trough west of Texas, and enhanced Great Plains low-level southerlies increasing moisture supply from the Gulf of Mexico. Attribution analysis indicated a significant increase in the El Niño-induced precipitation anomalies over Texas and Oklahoma when increases in the anthropogenic greenhouse gases were taken into account.

Studies by the Scripps Institution of Oceanography found for Texas that precipitation totals have increased 10 percent in the last century, but mostly in eastern Texas, with more frequent, severe and longer drought conditions in west Texas.

The report Regional Climate Trends and Scenarios for the U.S. National Climate Assessment (NCA) from 2013 by NOAA, projects that parts of Texas, and parts of the Great Plains region can expect up to 30% (High emissions scenario based on CMIP3 and NARCCAP models) increase in extreme precipitation days by midcentury. This definition is based on days receiving more than one inch of rainfall.

A study from April 2015 concluded that about 18% of the moderate daily precipitation extremes over land are attributable to observed temperature increase since the Industrial Revolution and that this primarily results from human influence.

Tornado events

Note: One tornado in Mexico was rated F3 but is listed as EF3 in the above table for convenience.

May 23 event

May 24 event

May 25 event

See also 

Effects of Tropical Storm Allison in Texas
June 2007 Texas flooding
May 31, 2013 Oklahoma flooding
Severe weather terminology (United States)
2016 Houston floods

Notes

References

Texas-Oklahoma floods, 2015
Floods
Floods
Floods
Floods
Floods
2015 meteorology
F3 tornadoes
Floods in Texas
May 23
2015 natural disasters in the United States
2015 in Mexico
Natural disasters in Mexico
May 2015 events in the United States
2015 disasters in Mexico
2015 floods in the United States